Daniel Hughes may refer to:

Dan Hughes (basketball) (born 1955), American basketball coach
Dan Hughes (Nebraska politician) (born 1956), member of U.S. state legislature
Daniel Hughes (cricketer) (born 1989), Australian cricketer
Daniel Hughes (underground railroad) (1804–1880), conductor on the Underground Railroad
Daniel Hughes (Australian footballer) (born 1986), Australian rules footballer
Daniel Hughes (Gaelic footballer), Gaelic football player from County Down, Northern Ireland
Daniel Hughes, psychologist who developed Dyadic developmental psychotherapy
Daniel Hughes (As the World Turns), a character on American soap opera As the World Turns
Daniel Hughes (politician) (1819–1879), banker, barrister and politician in colonial Victoria
Danny Hughes (born 1963), Australian rules footballer
Caleb Daniel Hughes